Punctuating may refer to

 Punctuation, in written language
 A method of cheating in poker with marked cards
 Punctuated equilibrium